Saundra Yancy McGuire is the Director Emerita of the Center for Academic Success and a retired Professor of Chemistry at Louisiana State University. She is best known for her work on science education, having written several papers and books on the subject. Her interests focus on improving student learning by involving faculty in metacognitive learning strategies.

Education
She received her B.S. degree from Southern University, Baton Rouge, Louisiana, graduating magna cum laude. Upon graduation, she attended Cornell University and received her master's degree. She received her Ph.D. from the University of Tennessee at Knoxville. There, she received the Chancellor's Citation for Exceptional Professional Promise.

Employment
Prior to her employment at LSU, McGuire spent eleven years working at Cornell University. She earned the Clark Distinguished Teaching Award. She is the retired Assistant Vice Chancellor and Professor of Chemistry at Louisiana State University. Her presentation record includes keynote addresses and workshops at over 250 institutions in 43 states and 8 countries. Her impressive publication record covers topics such as Learning and Teaching Strategies and Problem Solving Guides for Introductory Chemistry.

Awards

 2019 Suanne Davis Roueche Distinguished Lecturer Award, National Institute for Staff and Organizational Development (NISOD)
 2019 Commitment to Excellence in Academic Support Award, American College Personnel Association (ACPA
 2017 American Chemical Society (ACS) Award for Encouraging Disadvantaged Students into Careers in the Chemical Sciences
 2017 LSU College of Science Hall of Distinction Inductee
2017 Esprit de Femme Award, LSU Women's Center
2015 Lifetime Mentor Award, American Association for the Advancement of Science (AAAS)
2014 Lifetime Achievement Award, National Organization for the Professional Advancement of Black Chemists and Chemical Engineers (NOBCChE)
2013 Inaugural Dean's Visiting Scholar, College of Science, University of Cape Town, South Africa
2012 Inaugural Ronald O. Ragsdale Lecturer, Dept. of Chemistry, University of Utah
2012 Elected Fellow of the Council of Learning Assistance and Developmental Education Associations (CLADEA)
2011 Elected Fellow of AAAS
2011 Distinguished Teaching Award, College Reading and Learning Association (CRLA)
2010 Elected Fellow of ACS
2010 Awarded Lifetime Learning Center Leadership Certification by the National College Learning Center Association (NCLCA)
2008 Distinguished Alumna, Southern University Department of Chemistry
2007 Invited Speaker, ACS Presidential Symposium in Honor of Nobel Laureate Roald Hoffmann's 70th Birthday
2006 Presidential Award for Excellence in Science, Mathematics, and Engineering Mentoring (PAESMEM)
2002 Received the Outstanding Chemical Educator Award National Organization for Black Chemists and Chemical Engineers (NOBCChE)

Personal life
McGuire is married to Professor Stephen C. McGuire, a professor of physics at Southern University. Together, they have two daughters: Carla McGuire Davis and Stephanie McGuire.

References

Year of birth missing (living people)
Living people
21st-century American chemists
American educational theorists
Cornell University alumni
Fellows of the American Association for the Advancement of Science
Southern University alumni
University of Tennessee alumni
Louisiana State University faculty
American women chemists
American women academics
21st-century American women